Naugachia is a town and a notified area in Bhagalpur district in the Indian state of Bihar. It is a block and a division of the Bhagalpur district and also a police district.

Geography
Naugachia is located at 25°24′N 87°06′E . It has an average elevation of 25 metres (82 feet). It is bordered on one side by the river Ganges and other by the river Koshi. It is famous for yellow maize. It is also known as Kelanchal of Bihar (producer of bananas). Earlier, there used to be lot of problems regarding floods but after the construction of the ring dam on two of its borders, flood is no longer a problem to Naugachia. Naugachia is the heart of Bhagalpur because lots of business activities take place here and Vikaramshila Bridge is the only bridge that connects Bhagalpur to NH 31 via Naugachia because there is no railway line.

Demographics
 India census, Naugachia had a population of 49,069. Males constitute 55% of the population and females 45%. Naugachia has an average literacy rate of 62%, lower than the national average of 74%: male literacy is 69%, and female literacy is 55%. In Naugachia, 18% of the population is under 9 years of age.

Administration
Naugachia Nagar Panchayat is the governing body in the town popularly known as NAC (Notified Area Committee).

Transport
The Naugachia railway station, on the Barauni-Katihar section, is managed by the East Central Railway. The railway station code is NNA. The nearest airport is the Bhagalpur Airport. Naugachia lies close to the banks of Ganges river in South and Kosi river on North. Vikramshila Setu, the second longest road bridge across the Ganges, connects Naugachia with Barari Ghat in Bhagalpur. and  terminates here.

Places of interest
 Kadwa Diyara
(This place is about 8.0 kilometres far from Naugachia Railway Station and has good connectivity of roads. This is very famous for the endangered species of the giant "Garuda / गरुड़" bird which is only found in its nearby regions; Baba Vishuraut Kosi River Bridge is also a popular spot for the local people.)
 Shripur Naugachia
 Durga Mandir, Tetri(3.5 km from station)
 Shree Krishna mandir (Janmashtami Mela) Gosaingaon Naugachia (3 km from station)
 Venkateswara Temple, Nagrah (4 km north from station)
 Kali Shakti Peeth, Nagrah-Baisi (5  km north from station)
 Panchmukhi Hanuman mandir, Navada (2.7 km from station)
 Kali Mandir, Bhawanipur (1.9 km from station)
 Shiv Mandir Jagatpur ( 7 km from Naugachia Zeromile )
 Shiv Parwati Manokamna Mandir,Naya Tola ( 50 meter south from Station Naugachia )
 Chaiti Durga Mandir, Naya Tola Naugachia
 Shri Gopal Goshala (1.2 km from station)
 Durga Mandir, Bhramarpur (13 km from station)
 Babadham, Marwa (11.5 km from station)
 Shiv mandir and Hanuman mandir Jagatpur  (8 km from Naugachia )

Colleges under Tilkamanjhi Bhagalpur University
 M.A.M College, Gosain gaon panchayat Naugachia (1.3 km from station)
 G.B. College, Naugachia (0.4 km from station)
 Banarsi Lal Saraf Commerce College, Naugachia (Only one Commerce College in Naugachia)

Schools
 NKHS Jhandapur Presidency School, NH-31,Naugachia
 DDA Public School, Naugachia (Ms Dipti Dutta)
 Aadarsh Middle School and High School (आदर्श उच्च विद्यालय), Kadwa Pratapnagar
 High School, Naugachia (0.6m from station)
 Model High School Tulsipur Yamunia
 Savitri Public School, Naugachia (1.5 km from station)
 Bal Bharti Vidyalaya Hindi Medium (1 km from station)
 Bal Vidya Bharti Naya Tola Naugachia (0.200 km from Railway Station Naugachia)
 Phoolchandra Middile School Naya Tola Naugachia (100 meter from Railway Station Naugachia)
 Ramdhari Singh High School, Tetri Pakra
 Bharti Public School, Naya Tola (Khadi Bhandar) Naugachia 
 High school and Middle School, Punam Pratap Nagar Naugachia
 Data Mangan Shah Majaar, Bihpur (10 km from Naugachia)
 Jagatpur high school Jagatpur, and middle school Jagatpur (8 km from Naugachia)

References

Cities and towns in Bhagalpur district